Annales monégasques is a journal of Monégasque history.

History
The journal was established in 1977 by Franck Biancheri, the archivist of the Prince's Palace of Monaco. The first issue included articles on varied topics like La Condamine in the Middle Ages, Monaco-born music theorist Honoré Langlé, the Hymne Monégasque.

By 2012, the new editor, Thomas Fouilleron, the new archivist of the Prince's Palace of Monaco, suggested he wanted to digitalize past issues.

The 39th issue, published on November 27, 2015, includes articles about the relationship between the House of Grimaldi and the House of Romanov, the correspondence between Prince Pierre, Duke of Valentinois and author Marcel Proust, the friendship between Albert I, Prince of Monaco and composer Jules Massenet, and Alexandre Dumas's novel about Catherine Charlotte de Gramont, the wife of Louis I, Prince of Monaco.

References

History of Monaco
Magazines established in 1977
European history journals
1977 establishments in Monaco
Annual magazines